Hazelbury is a former village in the civil parish of Box, Wiltshire, England.

There was a Roman villa. Hazelbury was recorded in the Domesday Book of 1086 as Haseberie, with 25 households and a church. The church fell into disuse before 1540. In the 1872 Imperial Gazetteer of England and Wales, Hazelbury is described as "once was a parish; and it still ranks as a rectory in the diocese of Gloucester and Bristol". The name is spelled Hasilbury in a 1900 book.

Chapel Plaister, an ancient roadside church and hospice for pilgrims which still stands about half a mile to the south-east, was dependent on Hazelbury church.

The extinction of the village probably followed the Black Death pandemic.

References 

Box, Wiltshire
Former populated places in Wiltshire